Edward Casey may refer to:

 Eddie Casey (1894–1966), American football player and coach
 Edward S. Casey (born 1939), American philosopher
 Edward Pearce Casey (1864–1940), American designer and architect

See also
 Ed Casey (1933–2006), Australian politician
 Edgar Cayce (1877–1945), American mystic